The 1898 Guilford Quakers football team represented Guilford College as an independent during the 1898 college football season. They played in three games and went winless.

Schedule

References

Guilford
Guilford Quakers football seasons
College football winless seasons
Guilford Quakers football